Qaleh-ye Sukhteh or Qaleh Sukhteh may refer to:
 Qaleh-ye Sukhteh, Bushehr
 Qaleh Sukhteh, Chaharmahal and Bakhtiari